Princess Sibylla of Saxe-Coburg and Gotha (Sibylla Calma Marie Alice Bathildis Feodora; 18 January 1908 – 28 November 1972) was a member of the Swedish royal family and the mother of the current king of Sweden, Carl XVI Gustaf.

Born into the House of Saxe-Coburg and Gotha, Sibylla was the daughter of Charles Edward, the last duke of Saxe-Coburg and Gotha. She became a Swedish princess when she married Prince Gustaf Adolf, Duke of Västerbotten in 1932. She thus had the prospect of one day becoming queen, but the prince was killed in an airplane crash in 1947 and did not live to ascend the Swedish throne. Her son became king the year after her death.

Early life

Princess Sibylla (then Sibylle) was born on 18 January 1908 at Schloss Friedenstein in the city of Gotha, one of the two capitals in the Duchy of Saxe-Coburg and Gotha in central Germany. She was the elder daughter and second child of Charles Edward, Duke of Saxe-Coburg and Gotha, and Princess Victoria Adelaide of Schleswig-Holstein. Her father was a posthumous son of Prince Leopold, Duke of Albany, the youngest son of Queen Victoria of the United Kingdom and Prince Albert of Saxe-Coburg and Gotha. Prince Charles Edward had, at the urging of his grandmother, inherited the position of duke after his uncle in 1900. The same year he had married Princess Victoria Adelaide, who was a daughter of Friedrich Ferdinand, Duke of Schleswig-Holstein and Princess Karoline Mathilde of Schleswig-Holstein-Sonderburg-Augustenburg, and descended from an older Scandinavian royal house.

Like the other princes of the German Empire, her father was forced to abdicate in November 1918, just before the end of World War I, when the German monarchies were abolished amidst the tumults of the German Revolution of 1918–19. This also affected Princess Sibylla's position. In 1919, her father was deprived of his British peerages, as a consequence of the Titles Deprivation Act of 1917, which authorized enemies of the United Kingdom during the First World War to be deprived of their British peerages and royal titles. He and his children also lost their entitlement to the titles of Prince and Princess of the United Kingdom and the styles of Royal Highness and Highness.

Princess Sibylla grew up in Coburg with her siblings Hereditary Prince Johann Leopold, Prince Hubertus, Princess Caroline-Mathilde and Prince Friedrich Josias. The children received, as was common in aristocratic circles at the time, their initial schooling by private tutors and governesses. Later, Princess Sibylla attended the Gymnasium Alexandrinum in Coburg and the Kunstgewerbeschule in Weimar.

Marriage

In November 1931, Sibylla was in London to attend the wedding of her paternal first cousin Lady May Cambridge as a bridesmaid. One of the other bridesmaids was her second cousin Princess Ingrid of Sweden, who introduced Sibylla to her brother, Prince Gustaf Adolf, Duke of Västerbotten. Their engagement was announced at Callenberg Castle in Coburg 16 June 1932. Prince Gustaf Adolf was the eldest son of Crown Prince Gustav Adolf of Sweden (later King Gustaf VI Adolf) and Princess Margaret of Connaught, a granddaughter of Queen Victoria. Sibylla and Gustaf Adolf were thus second cousins, as they were both great-grandchildren of Queen Victoria.

 
The wedding took place in Coburg in October of the same year - known as the "Sweden Year", as in the same year the 300th-anniversary of the death of the great Swedish King Gustavus II Adolphus was marked. Although the monarchy had been abolished, the wedding was still celebrated in an official manner in Coburg, with, among other things, military honors and a public procession, as the German President Paul von Hindenburg had ordered that no honours should be spared. However, as the city of Coburg was already strongly dominated by the Nazi party at the time, the official celebrations there were Nazi influenced, which made a very bad impression in Sweden. On 19 October, Princess Sibylla married Prince Gustaf Adolf in a civil ceremony at the Veste Coburg, followed by a church wedding the following day after, at the St. Moriz Church. The couple spent their honeymoon in Italy before arriving in Stockholm on 25 November 1932.

The couple had five children:

Princess Margaretha (born 31 October 1934) married John Ambler on 30 June 1964. They had three children.
Princess Birgitta (born 19 January 1937) married Prince Johann Georg of Hohenzollern on 25 May 1961. They had three children. 
Princess Désirée (born 2 June 1938) married Baron Niclas Silfverschiöld on 5 June 1964. They had three children.
Princess Christina (born 3 August 1943) married Tord Magnuson on 15 June 1974. They have three sons.
Carl XVI Gustaf of Sweden (born 30 April 1946) married Silvia Sommerlath on 19 June 1976. They have three children.

Princess of Sweden

The couple settled at Haga Palace, and their four daughters were to be commonly known during their childhood as the "Hagaprinsessorna" (English: "The Haga Princesses"). Sibylla shared her husband's enthusiasm for sport and outdoor activities, and the couple owned a cottage in Ingarö and another one in Storlien.

During her lifetime, she was appointed chairman of various organisations such as Sällskapet Barnavård (English: "The Childcare Society") in 1948 and the honorary chairmanship of the Hörselfrämjandet (English: "The Hearing Society") in 1935; the Sveriges flickscoutråd (English: "The Swedish Girls Scouts") in 1939; Kvinnliga bilkåren (English: "The Women's Automobile Force") in 1939; the Stiftelsen Solstickan (English: "The Solstickan Society") in 1941; and the Stiftelsen Drottning Victorias Vilohem på Öland (English: "The Queen Victoria Resting Home in Öland") in 1951. In 1938, she founded the Prinsessan Sibyllas S:t Martin-stiftelse (English: "The Princess Sibylla Foundation of St Martin").

Widowhood

Sibylla became a widow in 1947 when Gustaf Adolf died in an airplane crash at the Copenhagen Airport in Denmark. Their only son, Carl Gustaf, became second-in-line to the throne at the age of nine months and, later, Crown Prince at the age of four. In 1950, Sibylla moved from Haga to the Royal Palace of Stockholm. During the summers, she stayed at Solliden. During these years, she developed an interest in environmental issues.

After her stepmother-in-law, Queen Louise, died in 1965, Princess Sibylla became the highest ranking woman in the royal family. She took over her duties in support of her father-in-law, King Gustaf VI Adolf. During these years, she enjoyed somewhat more popularity, as she was more exposed, and as her humour and sense of self-irony became more known and appreciated. She continued with the so-called "Democratic ladies lunches" for career women initiated by Queen Louise in 1962 as a replacement for the court presentation.

Sibylla died in Stockholm of cancer less than a year before her son ascended to the throne.

Honours

  House of Saxe-Coburg and Gotha: Knight Grand Cross of the Saxe-Ernestine House Order
 : Member Grand Cross of the Royal Order of the Seraphim (LoK av KMO)
 : Grand Cross of the Order of Merit of the Federal Republic of Germany, Special Issue
 : Dame Grand Cross of the Order of the Gold Lion of the House of Nassau

Ancestry

Notes

References

Citations

Bibliography 
 .

External links

 

1908 births
1972 deaths
British princesses
Sibylla 1932
Sibylla
People from Gotha (town)
Sibylla
Deaths from cancer in Sweden
Burials at Kungliga begravningsplatsen
House of Bernadotte
German people of English descent
Grand Crosses Special Class of the Order of Merit of the Federal Republic of Germany
Daughters of monarchs